Austrogomphus collaris, also known as Austrogomphus (Austrogomphus) collaris, is a species of dragonfly of the family Gomphidae, 
commonly known as the western inland hunter. 
It inhabits streams, rivers and pools in south-western Australia.

Austrogomphus collaris is a tiny to medium-sized, black and yellow dragonfly.

Gallery

See also
 List of Odonata species of Australia

References

Gomphidae
Odonata of Australia
Insects of Australia
Endemic fauna of Australia
Taxa named by Hermann August Hagen
Insects described in 1854